Ballarat Greyhounds or Morshead Park is a greyhound racing track located at Morshead Park, Sutton Street and Rubicon Street, Ballarat Central Victoria, Australia. Morshead Park is operated by the Ballarat Greyhound Racing Club (BGRC) and regulated by Greyhound Racing Victoria (GRV). It hosts the Ballarat Cup and has race distances over 390, 450, 545 and 650 metres. Racing is conducted Monday and Wednesday and occasional Saturdays and includes Tabcorp betting facilities and video replays broadcast on and off course.

History
The Ballarat Greyhound Racing Club was formed in 1935 and the original track was located at Broadway Park (the North Ballarat Sports Club today) in Creswick Road, adjoining the Ballarat Showgrounds. The track was opened on 11 March 1938 by councillor H J Wheeler.

Over a three-year period during the late 1970s a new racing complex was constructed at the present site at Morshead Park. The opening meeting was held on Saturday 23 December 1978 with the first race winner being Eddy Tornado trained by W R Dalton. The meeting included a match race (a two-runner race only, where two greyhounds are matched against each other) between Melbourne Cup winner Tangaloa and Sandown Park track record holder Darville's Flyer, won by the latter.

During 2012 the venue underwent a significant facility upgrade costing $3.2 million. The upgrade was spilt between GRV ($1.7 million), the Coalition Government ($1.35 million) and the BGRC ($150,000) and included a major transformation of the grandstand and race track. The first meeting after the upgrade was held on Wednesday 3 October 2012.

Track distances

Ballarat Cup Roll of Honour
The Cup was first held in 1960 at Broadway Park over 496 yards. In 2020 the winner received $47,000 although prizes have been higher in the past.

Past winners

References 

Greyhound racing venues in Australia
Tourist attractions in Ballarat